PRICKLE1-related progressive myoclonus epilepsy with ataxia is a very rare genetic disorder which is characterized by myoclonic epilepsy and ataxia.

Signs and symptoms 

Ataxia is usually one of the first symptoms of this disorder, followed by early/mid childhood-onset myoclonus, which can lead to dysarthria, and mid/late childhood-onset epilepsy. It is more common for the epileptic grand-mal seizures to begin at night. This is one of few genetic disorders which do not affect the intellect of the person afflicted by it.

Causes 

As its name suggests, this disorder is caused by mutations (usually a point one) of the PRICKLE1 gene, in chromosome 12. This gene produces a protein called "prickle homolog 1" which is thought (but not certainly known) to be essential in brain development. These mutations are inherited either by autosomal recessive or autosomal dominant inheritance.

Treatment 
This condition is usually managed with occupational therapy, physical therapy, and speech therapy, anti-seizure medications, and adaptive devices.

Epidemiology 
According to OMIM, only 17 cases from families in the Middle East and Western Asia (more specifically, Saudi Arabia and Jordan).

References 

Rare genetic syndromes
Epilepsy types